Spytihněv is a municipality and village in Zlín District in the Zlín Region of the Czech Republic. It has about 1,700 inhabitants.

History
The first written mention of Spytihněv is from 1141.

Notable people
Rudolf Kučera (born 1940), footballer

Gallery

References

External links

Villages in Zlín District